Landlady's wig can refer to two kinds of seaweeds:

 Ahnfeltia plicata
 Desmarestia

See also
 Landlord
 Wig